"Shock to the System" is a single by English musician Billy Idol, released to promote his 1993 album, Cyberpunk. It became a top-40 hit in six countries, including Idol's native United Kingdom, but did not make it onto the US Billboard Hot 100.

Conception
Idol explained for MTV News, that he had originally created the song with an entirely different set of lyrics, but upon witnessing the Los Angeles riots of 1992 on television, he immediately rewrote and recorded them that day.

Music video
A music video was created for the song, and was set in a dystopian future controlled by Cyber-cops (referred to as such by director Brett Leonard). It depicted an individual who records the Cyber-cops beating a man, only to be noticed and attacked himself. His camera is destroyed and the Cyber-cops leave him unconscious on the ground, as they are busy trying to put down a riot elsewhere in the city. Alone, his camera equipment lands on him and is absorbed into his body, causing him to dramatically morph into a cyborg. The cyborg then joins the riot, leading the rebels to victory.

Idol explained that he was trying to capture the political and economic conflict that had created the LA Riots, and that the camcorder – as displayed in the witnessing of the Rodney King beating – was a "potent way of conveying ideas" and an important metaphor for technology used in rebellion.

The make-up effects were achieved through stop motion, with Billy Idol moving in slow stages during points of the filming. Stan Winston, who had previously worked on the Terminator series and Jurassic Park, supervised and created the special effects for the video. The music video for "Shock to the System" was nominated for "Best Special Effects in a Video" and "Best Editing in a Video" at the 1993 MTV Video Music Awards, losing both times to Peter Gabriel's video for "Steam".

The video was later released on NTSC VHS along with a making-of documentary and a remix, as well as a video for Idol's previous single "Heroin".

Reception
The video and song were also heavily analyzed for the overtones of racial, sexual, and physical trauma presented within them by Thomas Foster, associate professor at Indiana University, in his 2005 book, The Souls of Cyberfolk.

Track listings
Several singles for "Shock to the System" were released to various countries. Several included various remixes of "Heroin", a cover of The Velvet Underground's song of the same name, composed and written by Lou Reed. The cover of "Heroin" also included the lyric "Jesus died for somebody's sins/But not mine", written by Patti Smith for her cover of "Gloria". The Australian, Japan, Netherlands, and U.S. releases included the track "Aftershock", which was not included in the Cyberpunk CD.

U.K. double CD release

Charts

Release history

References

External links
 "Shock to the System", on the Clipland database.
 "Shock to the System", Chrysalis, Yahoo! Music, 2008.
 , EMI America Records, 26 June 2008.
 "Shock to the System", Chrysalis/EMI Records, SingingFool.

1993 songs
1993 singles
Billy Idol songs
Chrysalis Records singles
Protest songs
Songs against racism and xenophobia
Songs based on actual events
Songs written by Billy Idol